The Curve of the Earth is the second album by Canadian band Attack in Black, released on November 13, 2007. The album was released on one thousand 12" vinyl records, and was also available for digital download. The album was released on the indie label Dine Alone Records alongside their EP Northern Towns.

Recording 
In September 2007, the band started recording songs on a two-input tape recorder Daniel Romano had found around his house. All of the members spent two days and two nights in Spencer Burton's sunroom, recording everything they wrote, and contributing to vocals and different instruments. Late into the second day, the band decided to release their recordings, although this was not their original intention.

Track listing 
 "I'm Going to Forget" - 4:16
 "Ever Faster" - 2:32
 "Sparrow" - 2:35
 "Water Touched My Face" - 2:28
 "Now That I'm Dying" - 3:34
 "You're Such an Only Child" - 1:57
 "Morning Bird / Water Line" - 2:56
 "Ever Bright, Ever Blue" - 2:12
 "Rope" - 2:23
 "Sounds of Dawn and Dusk" - 4:51
 "Lady of the Lourdes" - 1:54
 "The Curve of the Earth" - 2:43

References 
 Attack In Black @ Blogspot

Dine Alone Records albums
Attack in Black albums
2007 albums